Jack Malone (28 April 1919 – 16 September 1984) was an Australian rules footballer who played with Footscray in the Victorian Football League (VFL).

Notes

External links 

1919 births
1984 deaths
Australian rules footballers from Melbourne
Western Bulldogs players
People from Carlton, Victoria